WJJR (98.1 FM, "98.1 JJR") is an American radio station broadcasting an adult contemporary music format. Licensed to Rutland, Vermont, United States, the station serves the Lebanon-Rutland-White River Junction area. The station is currently owned by Pamal Broadcasting.

History
The station was assigned call sign WHWB-FM on March 18, 1969; it signed on March 25, 1971, and was licensed on May 4. On August 24, 1984, the station changed its call sign to the current WJJR.

In 1991, some scenes for the science fiction movie Time Chasers were filmed at the WJJR studios.

Previous logos

References

External links
WJJR official website

WJJR live stream

JJR
Mainstream adult contemporary radio stations in the United States
Pamal Broadcasting
Radio stations established in 1971
1971 establishments in Vermont